Zaratán is a municipality located in the province of Valladolid, Castile and León, Spain. According to the 2004 census (INE), the municipality had a population of 2,115 inhabitants.

See also
Cuisine of the province of Valladolid

References

Municipalities in the Province of Valladolid